Greenport Village Historic District is a national historic district located at Greenport in Suffolk County, New York. The district has 254 contributing buildings.    It contains a large, dense collection of largely unchanged structures from about 1750 to the 1930s.  It includes a simple 18th and 19th century settlement period house, a large representative mixture of mid- to late-19th century residential design, a small Main Street commercial district, and architecturally distinctive churches and institutional buildings.

It was added to the National Register of Historic Places in 1986.

References

Historic districts on the National Register of Historic Places in New York (state)
Federal architecture in New York (state)
Historic districts in Suffolk County, New York
National Register of Historic Places in Suffolk County, New York